Kássio Nunes Marques (born 16 May 1972 in Teresina) is a Brazilian magistrate, currently a Justice at the Supreme Federal Court

On 1 October 2020, president Jair Bolsonaro confirmed the nomination of Nunes to assume a seat in the Supreme Federal Court, due to the retirement of justice Celso de Mello. Nunes' nomination was confirmed by both Senate Justice Committee and Senate floor on 21 October 2020.

Academic career
Nunes was the first in his family to attend college. After receiving his Bachelor of Laws from the Federal University of Piauí (UFPI), Nunes concluded a specialization in tax law at the Federal University of Ceará (UFCE), as well as Master of Constitutional Law at the Autonomous University of Lisbon. Nunes recently defended his thesis for his doctorate at the University of Salamanca.

Judicial career
In May 2008, Nunes became a judge of the Electoral Regional Court of Piauí (TRE-PI).

On 12 July 2011, Nunes was nominated by president Dilma Rousseff to serve as desembargador of the Federal Regional Court of the 1st Region (TRF-1), due to the "Constitutional Fifth", after the retirement of desembargador Carlos Mathias.

On 30 September 2020, president Jair Bolsonaro told the justices of the Supreme Federal Court of his intention to nominate Nunes to be member of the court, replacing justice Celso de Mello, due to his retirement. His choice was considered, by allies of the president and by the press, as a surprise, given that Nunes wasn't in the lists of potential nominees for the seat. Nunes was classified as "balanced and discreet". At the same time, two members of the high court commented, in a reserved talk with the press, that they were relieved by the nomination, since Nunes wasn't "highly identified with Bolsonaro".

Personal life
Nunes declares himself as a Catholic. He is married to Maria do Socorro Marques, who in 2020 worked as a commissioned employee for the staff of senator Elmano Férrer (PODE-PI), and who, previously, served in the staff of senator Wellington Dias (PT-PI) between 2011 and 2014, his first substitute, Regina Sousa (PT-PI), between 2015 and 2018, and second substitute Zé Santana (MDB-PI) in 2019.

References

|-

1972 births
Living people
Brazilian Roman Catholics
People from Teresina
University of Lisbon alumni
21st-century Brazilian judges
Vaza Jato